Ferro Lad (Andrew Nolan) is a superhero appearing in DC Comics, primarily as a member of the Legion of Super-Heroes in the 30th century. In post-Zero Hour continuity, he is simply known as Ferro.

Publication history
Ferro Lad first appeared in Adventure Comics #346 and was created by Jim Shooter. When Jim Shooter first created the character, he intended Ferro Lad to be black, but editor Mort Weisinger vetoed the idea, saying "we'll lose our distribution in the South".

This was in fact one reason why Shooter chose Ferro Lad to be the one to die in the Sun-Eater story. In a 2003 interview, Shooter said: "Ferro Lad, I killed because my plan was that he was a black guy, and Mort Weisinger said no. Then I said, "Well, let's see. I've got this idea for a story, and someone needs to die...Ah-ha! Him!" So basically, I killed him off because it annoyed me that I couldn't do with him what I wanted". 

However, in a 2011 blog post, he had a different explanation: "I thought Mort might object if I killed an established, long-term Legionnaire, but what if it was one of the new ones I'd created? Maybe that would fly. So I did it. I didn't ask, I just did it. Why Ferro Lad? Because his powers suited the opportunity. How would Princess Projectra or even Karate Kid survive the death-run into the heart of the Sun-Eater?"

Shooter made double-sure that Ferro Lad would stay dead by setting the next issue ten years in the future, in which a statue of Ferro Lad is on display in the Legion's hall of the honored dead.

The Life and Death of Ferro Lad, a hardcover trade paperback collecting the Silver Age appearances of Ferro Lad, was released in 2009.

Fictional character biography

Silver Age
Andrew Nolan is a metahuman with the power to transform himself into living iron. He has a twin brother named Douglas who has the same power. Both twins have deformed faces as a side effect of the mutation that gave them their powers, so both wear iron masks. He first appears in Adventure Comics #346 (July 1966); he joined at the same time as Princess Projectra, Karate Kid and Nemesis Kid.

Ferro Lad was only a Legionnaire for a short time when he was killed destroying the Sun-Eater with a bomb in Adventure Comics #353. His self-sacrifice to save the galaxy made him legendary, despite his short tenure as a Legionnaire, with many later Silver Age stories featuring references to his death, both the event itself and a statue erected in his memory was often visible in the Legion's headquarters. He next appears in Adventure Comics #357 (June 1967), but as a ghost, seemingly saving a number of his former teammates from a Controller, representative of a race of superior beings.

Many years later—during the "Five Year Gap" following the Magic Wars—Earth fell under the covert control of the Dominators, and withdrew from the United Planets. Some time thereafter, the members of the Dominators' highly classified "Batch SW6" escaped captivity. Originally, Batch SW6 appeared to be a group of teenage Legionnaire clones, created from samples apparently taken just prior to Ferro Lad's death at the hands of the Sun-Eater. Later, they were revealed to be time-paradox duplicates, every bit as legitimate as their older counterparts. After Earth was destroyed in a disaster reminiscent of the destruction of Krypton over a millennium earlier, a few dozen surviving cities and their inhabitants reconstituted their world as New Earth. The SW6 Legionnaires remained, and their version of Ferro Lad shortened his code name to Ferro.

Post-Zero Hour
In post-Zero Hour continuity he is known as Ferro and comes from 20th century Earth.

Born in the 20th century, Andrew Nolan and his twin, Douglas, were the sons of a famous actress, Nancy Nolan, who abandoned them because of their grotesque facial deformities.

Left in the care of an unscrupulous scientist called "Doc 30", he escaped while Douglas remained behind. When the Earth was dying due to the extinguishing of the sun in the so-called Final Night, he first helps Perry White, who was determined the Daily Planet would not miss one day of delivery. Then he becomes involved with the Legion of Super-Heroes, who had become stranded in the present day. This team joins with dozens of other superheroes to help try to save the Earth. Ferro comes close to heroically sacrificing his life in an effort to stop the Sun-Eater. At the last instant, he is saved by Hal Jordan, who was maintaining the power and identity of Parallax. Jordan seemingly sacrifices his own life and the sun is restored. Ferro remains with the team, although it was some time before they informed him they were from the 31st century.

When the Legion were able to return to their home time, Ferro went with them and served with them for some time until several of the team were lost in a rift, and the remainder ordered to disband. After this he went with Karate Kid to a monastery on the planet Steeple, a planet only accessible for short periods every ten years before a black hole prevented access once more. While there, he finally learned to deal with his deformity, but he was savagely beaten by an escaped convict and, while the monks were able to save his life, he was trapped in iron form with the helmet he wore fused to his face. Moreover, he and Karate Kid, who had refused to leave his friend behind, were now trapped on the planet for ten years.

Brainiac 5 was able to use the Threshold technology he had learned of during his time lost to open a path to Steeple, but before anyone could use it, he, along with all of the Legion (bar Sensor and Shikari) and several whole planets were entranced by Universo. Sensor and Shikari were forced to use the unstable link to Steeple to escape, and the four of them were able to free Saturn Girl who, with aid from Apparition and Ultra Boy's child, Cub, was able to defeat Universo, while Ferro and Karate Kid rejoined the team.

The Lightning Saga
The events of the Infinite Crisis miniseries have apparently restored a close analogue of the pre-Crisis Legion to continuity, as seen in "The Lightning Saga" story arc in Justice League of America and Justice Society of America, and in the "Superman and the Legion of Super-Heroes" story arc in Action Comics. Andrew is depicted as a member of this version of the team in Justice Society of America (vol. 3) #5 (June 2007), and Action Comics #858 (late December 2007). However, this incarnation of the Legion shares roughly the same history as the original Legion up to the events of Crisis on Infinite Earths. Therefore, this version of Andrew is presumably deceased.

Powers and abilities
Andrew Nolan has the ability to transform his body into a nearly indestructible isotope of iron. Unlike Stone Boy, Nolan maintains his full mobility, normal intellect, and capacity for speech. His iron-like form can resist considerable damage, including direct hits by laser blasts. He could use this power offensively by ramming into an opponent or obstacle. Ferro Lad's physical strength had been increased when in metal form, allowing him to bend and shape steel like clay.

Equipment
As a member of the Legion of Super-Heroes, he is provided with his own Legion Flight Ring. It allows him to fly and survive in dangerous environments. He also has a built-in radio mask for communication in airless space.

Other versions
In Legion of Super-Heroes (vol. 2) #300, Douglas Nolan glimpses an alternate universe where he became the second Ferro Lad after Andrew's death against the Sun-Eater.

In Amalgam Comics, Ferro Lad combines with Marvel's Colossus to create Ferro Man of the X-Patrol.

In other media

Animation
 Ferro Lad appears in the Legion of Super Heroes episode "Chain of Command", voiced by Dave Wittenberg. In the episode, he assists Cosmic Boy (who recently returned to the Legion) to help save Lightning Lad's planet. True to the original story, he sacrifices himself destroying the Sun-Eater, though the season one finale "Sundown" implies him to be alive. According to producer James Tucker, Ferro Lad's long-lost twin brother would have appeared had the show been renewed for a third season.
 Ferro Lad's statue is seen in the hall of honor of the old Legion's headquarters in the Justice League Unlimited episode "Far from Home". 
 A statue of Ferro Lad appears in Justice League vs. the Fatal Five.
Ferro Lad makes a cameo appearance in the 2023 film Legion of Super-Heroes.

See also
 The Death of Ferro Lad
 The Final Night

References

External links
 Ferro Lad at Comic Vine

DC Comics characters who are shapeshifters
DC Comics characters with superhuman strength
DC Comics metahumans
DC Comics male superheroes
Comics characters introduced in 1966
Characters created by Jim Shooter
Fictional characters with superhuman durability or invulnerability
Fictional twins
Fictional suicide attacks